KHNA may refer to:

 KHNA-LP, a low-power radio station (94.3 FM) licensed to serve Sheridan, Wyoming, United States
 KKAR, a radio station (104.9 FM) licensed to serve Wamsutter, Wyoming, which held the call sign KHNA from 2009 to 2013